Shchuchy (masculine), Shchuchya (feminine), or Shchuchye (neuter) is the name of several inhabited localities in Russia.

Urban localities
Shchuchye, Shchuchansky District, Kurgan Oblast, a town in Shchuchansky District of Kurgan Oblast

Rural localities
Shchuchy (rural locality), a khutor in Kletsky Selsoviet of Sredneakhtubinsky District of Volgograd Oblast
Shchuchya, a village in Dubrovinsky Rural Okrug of Yarkovsky District of Tyumen Oblast
Shchuchye, Bryansk Oblast, a settlement in Ryabchovsky Selsoviet of Trubchevsky District of Bryansk Oblast
Shchuchye, Mishkinsky District, Kurgan Oblast, a village in Voskhodsky Selsoviet of Mishkinsky District of Kurgan Oblast
Shchuchye, Vargashinsky District, Kurgan Oblast, a village in Popovsky Selsoviet of Vargashinsky District of Kurgan Oblast
Shchuchye, Yurgamyshsky District, Kurgan Oblast, a village in Malobelovsky Selsoviet of Yurgamyshsky District of Kurgan Oblast
Shchuchye, Omsk Oblast, a settlement in Alexeyevsky Rural Okrug of Lyubinsky District of Omsk Oblast
Shchuchye, Oryol Oblast, a village in Maslovsky Selsoviet of Orlovsky District of Oryol Oblast
Shchuchye, Tula Oblast, a selo in Prudishchinsky Rural Okrug of Venyovsky District of Tula Oblast
Shchuchye, Ostashkovsky District, Tver Oblast, a village in Ostashkovsky District, Tver Oblast
Shchuchye, Zharkovsky District, Tver Oblast, a village in Zharkovsky District, Tver Oblast
Shchuchye, Tyumen Oblast, a village in Zavodoukovsky District of Tyumen Oblast
Shchuchye, Ertilsky District, Voronezh Oblast, a selo in Shchuchinskoye Rural Settlement of Ertilsky District of Voronezh Oblast
Shchuchye, Liskinsky District, Voronezh Oblast, a selo in Shchuchenskoye Rural Settlement of Liskinsky District of Voronezh Oblast
Shchuchye, Yamalo-Nenets Autonomous Okrug, a settlement in Priuralsky District of Yamalo-Nenets Autonomous Okrug

Other meanings
Shchuchye (lake), located next to Shchuchinsk, Kazakhstan
Shchuchy Range, Chukotka